Wang Naidong ( 20th century), also known as Lyton Wong, was a Chinese actor active from 1925 to 1944 in the cinema of Shanghai and British Hong Kong. He starred in many silent films produced by Great China Lilium Pictures (大中華百合影片公司), but is probably best remembered today for playing the male lead in the 1935 Lianhua Film Company classic New Women opposite Ruan Lingyu. Virtually nothing is known about his personal life, but a source claims he was from Wuhan.

Filmography

References

External links

20th-century Chinese male actors
Chinese male film actors
Male actors from Wuhan
Chinese male silent film actors